Kornstadfjorden or Kornstadfjord is a fjord that runs between Averøy Municipality and Hustadvika Municipality in Møre og Romsdal county, Norway. The villages of Visnes and Eide lie on the west side of the fjord and the village of Kornstad is located on the east side of the fjord.

On the south end of the fjord, it becomes the Kvernesfjorden and runs to the northeast. On the north end of the fjord, it becomes the Lauvøyfjorden, near where the Atlantic Ocean Road (Atlanterhavsveien) crosses the fjord.

References

Fjords of Møre og Romsdal
Hustadvika (municipality)
Averøy